Kahnu (also Romanized as Kahnū, Kahanow, Kahnoo, and Kahnow) is a village in Damen Rural District, in the Central District of Iranshahr County, Sistan and Baluchestan Province, Iran. At the 2006 census, its population was 372, in 81 families.

References 

Populated places in Iranshahr County